The Krnov Synagogue is a synagogue in Krnov, Czech Republic. It was built in 1871. It is one of only three surviving synagogues in the Moravian-Silesian Region (the others are at Nový Jičín and Český Těšín).

Description

The exterior of the building with twin towers and round-arched windows is in an eclectic, round-arched, Rundbogenstil neo-romantic style. The interior is Moorish Revival, especially the wooden carved coffered ceiling (painted in reddish brown) and the arcade of the women's galleries.

History

1938–1945
The Krnov Synagogue stopped to be used for religious services in autumn 1938, when the Sudetenland was incorporated into Nazi Germany. Not long afterwards, on 9 November 1938, almost all synagogues in the surrounding towns – as anywhere in Nazi Germany – were destroyed during the Reichskristallnacht prosecution.

However, the synagogue was saved. End of October 1938, the mayor of Krnov, Oskar König, had received a secret order from Berlin to destroy and burn down the synagogue of his town on 9 November. Unwilling to comply, he summoned a meeting of the councillors and informed them about the order he had received. The Sudeten councillors then unanimously accepted the proposal of the builder Franz Irblich to deceive the Nazis: They decided to remove all symbols of the Jewish religion from the building and change it into a town market hall, reporting to Berlin that there was no synagogue in Jägerndorf which could be destroyed. As such the building was used until the end of World War II in 1945.

After 1945
After World War II the German population of Krnov was expelled and the building of the synagogue was first used as a warehouse, than as a regional archive. It was damaged during the 1997 Central European flood, two years later it was finally returned to the Jewish community in Olomouc with no Jewish community in Krnov existing anymore. Between 2003 and 2014 it was thoroughly renovated. Today, credit is given to Franz Irblich to be the savior of the synagogue also by the now Czech town of Krnov. In 1946, Irblich had received a 10 years sentence by a Czechoslovak extraordinary court after accusations of being a Nazi.

Gallery

Literature
 Badenheuer, Konrad / Heller, Wilfried: Notiz zur Rettung der Synagoge von Jägerndorf (Krnov). [Notice on how the Jägerndorf (Krnov) Synagogue was Saved] in: Heller, Wilfried (Editor): Jüdische Spuren im ehemaligen Sudetenland. [Jewish Relicts in the former Sudetenland] Verlag Inspiration Un Limited, London/Berlin 2019, pp. 157–164 (In German).

References

External links
Article about the restoration of the synagogue

Krnov
Synagogues in the Czech Republic
Moorish Revival synagogues
Buildings and structures in the Moravian-Silesian Region
Rundbogenstil synagogues
Synagogue buildings with domes
Synagogues completed in 1871
19th-century religious buildings and structures in the Czech Republic